Major General Clifford Coffin  (10 February 1870 – 4 February 1959) was a British Army officer and recipient of the Victoria Cross, the highest and most prestigious award for gallantry in the face of the enemy that can be awarded to British and Commonwealth forces.

Biography
Born in Blackheath, the son of Lieutenant General Sir Isaac Coffin, Clifford Coffin was educated at Haileybury and Imperial Service College and the Royal Military Academy, Woolwich. He was commissioned as a Second Lieutenant in the Corps of Royal Engineers. He served in the Second Boer War and was mentioned in dispatches.

He was 47 years old, and a temporary brigadier general commanding the 25th Infantry Brigade during the First World War, when the following deed took place for which he was awarded the Victoria Cross for "most conspicuous bravery and devotion to duty".

On 31 July 1917 in Westhoek, Belgium, Coffin's brigade had been shattered attempting to cross the marshy ground around the Hanebeek stream. According to his citation in the London Gazette: "When his command had been held up in attack owing to heavy machine-gun and rifle fire from front and right flank, and was establishing itself in a forward shell-hole line, he went forward and made an inspection of his front posts. Though under the heaviest fire from both machine-guns and rifles, and in full view of the enemy, he showed an utter disregard of personal danger, walking quietly from shell-hole to shell-hole, giving advice and cheering his men by his presence. His very gallant conduct had the greatest effect on all ranks, and it was largely owing to his personal courage and example that the shell-hole line was held in spite of the very heaviest fire. Throughout the day his calm courage and example exercised the greatest influence over all with whom he came into contact, and it is generally agreed that Brigadier-General Coffin's splendid example saved the situation, and had it not been for his action the line would certainly have been driven back".

Coffin served as Officer Commanding Troops, Ceylon and ADC to King George V. He later achieved the rank of major general and was Colonel Commandant Royal Engineers.

He died in February 1959 and is buried at Holy Trinity Churchyard, Colemans Hatch, East Sussex. His Victoria Cross is displayed at the Royal Engineers Museum in Chatham, Kent. In 2012, his grave was renovated by the Victoria Cross Trust.

References

Further reading
Monuments to Courage (David Harvey, 1999)
The Register of the Victoria Cross (This England, 1997)
The Sapper VCs (Gerald Napier, 1998)
VCs of the First World War - Passchendaele 1917 (Stephen Snelling, 1998)

External links

Royal Engineers Museum Sappers VCs
Location of grave and VC medal (East Sussex)

 

1870 births
1959 deaths
Burials in East Sussex
British Army major generals
Military personnel from London
People from Blackheath, London
British World War I recipients of the Victoria Cross
Royal Engineers officers
British Army personnel of the Second Boer War
British Army generals of World War I
Companions of the Order of the Bath
Chevaliers of the Légion d'honneur
Recipients of the Croix de Guerre 1914–1918 (France)
Companions of the Distinguished Service Order
British Army recipients of the Victoria Cross
Members of the Legislative Council of Ceylon